Ian Merrill (born 4 April 1965) is a British author, journalist and artist.

Ian Merrill started his career in publishing at Dorling Kindersley, HarperCollins, and The Wall Street Journal in Brussels. Returning to London, he became a full-time journalist writing freelance for The Independent, LA Weekly, The Insider and others. At the same time he co-authored an online satirical magazine called Fabgirl with Matthew Wakefield.

In 2001, he moved to France with his wife and two children. His first book, Coq & Bull - Going Mad in Normandy, was published in 2004. In 2007 he published the psychological novel, She Eats Souls.

Who Wants the World: Alternative Ambitions for the Disillusioned, was published in 2013 and described as the 'antithesis of the traditional self-help genre of positive affirmations'. Merrill claims there is a magic spell, or cosmic truth, buried within the text that is for the reader to investigate.

External links 
 Ian Merrill's website
 Article in LA Weekly
 Article in The Independent

British male journalists
British writers
Living people
1965 births